Buster Brown (August 15, 1911 – January 31, 1976) was an American blues and R&B singer best known for his hit, "Fannie Mae".

Biography
Brown was born in Cordele, Georgia. In the 1930s and 1940s he played harmonica at local clubs and made a few non-commercial recordings. These included "War Song" and "I'm Gonna Make You Happy" (1943), which were recorded when he played at the folk festival at Fort Valley (GA) State Teachers College, for the Library of Congress' Folk Music Archive.

Brown moved to New York in 1956, where he was discovered by Fire Records owner Bobby Robinson. In 1959, at almost fifty years of age, Brown recorded the rustic blues, "Fannie Mae", which featured Brown's harmonica playing and whoops, which went to # 38 in the US Top 40, and to #1 on the R&B chart in April 1960. His remake of Louis Jordan's "Is You Is or Is You Ain't My Baby" reached # 81 on the pop charts later in 1960, but did not make the R&B chart. "Sugar Babe" was his only other hit, in 1962, reaching # 19 on the R&B chart and # 99 on the pop chart.

In later years he recorded for Checker Records and for numerous small record labels. He also co-wrote the song "Doctor Brown" with J. T. Brown, which was later covered by Fleetwood Mac on their 1968 album, Mr. Wonderful.

He enjoyed further attention in 1973 when his song "Fannie Mae" was included in the film 
American Graffiti and its accompanying soundtrack album.

Death
Brown died in New York City in 1976, at the age of 64.

It is often erroneously cited that Brown's real name was "Wayman Glasco" – however, that was Brown's manager who, after his death, bought all of Brown's publishing – thus unintentionally creating the confusion. Though likely a nickname, or alias, Buster Brown may have been his birth name.

Discography

Studio album
New King of the Blues (Fire, 1961)

Compilations
Get Down With Buster Brown (Souffle, 1973) - reissue of the Fire lp.
Raise a Ruckus Tonight (DJM, 1976)
Toughest Terry & Baddest Brown (Sundown, 1986) – with Sonny Terry
Good News (Charly, 1989)
The Very Best of Buster Brown (Collectables, 1999)

References

External links
[ Allmusic]
Illustrated Buster Brown discography

1911 births
1976 deaths
American blues singers
American rhythm and blues singers
20th-century African-American male singers
Harmonica blues musicians
People from Cordele, Georgia
Singers from Georgia (U.S. state)
Checker Records artists